Michael Brian McBain (born January 12, 1977) is a Canadian former professional ice hockey player.

Early life and family
Born in Kimberley, British Columbia to Dale and Eileen McBain, he is also the brother of Jason McBain who played professional hockey for the Hartford Whalers.

Playing career
McBain spent 64 games in the National Hockey League with the Tampa Bay Lightning between 1997 and 1999, scoring seven points. After spending four years between the IHL and AHL, McBain eventually left North America to play in England with the Bracknell Bees. After spending two seasons with the Bees, McBain returned to North America to play with the Las Vegas Wranglers. McBain played with the Wranglers from 2003 to 2008 and was team captain from 2005-07.

After five seasons with the Wranglers, McBain retired in 2008 and became an assistant coach with the team.

Legal trouble
McBain was formally charged with nine counts of sexual assault of a minor on July 15, 2012. According to police reports, the unnamed 16-year-old girl was sexually assaulted by McBain between 2008 and 2012 while impersonating an on-and-off teammate (Jason Krischuk) by impersonating him using a false email account. Once the unnamed girl reported the assault to her mother, her mother confronted McBain. McBain eventually left the state, fleeing from Nevada to Oregon to a family member's place where he tried to commit suicide by overdosing on sleeping pills. McBain was eventually admitted to a local hospital and was later visited by the victim's mother, where he admitted that he had sexually assaulted her daughter. He also wrote the girl an apology letter.

McBain turned himself on July 5 at the Clark County Detention Center. He pleaded guilty in September to attempted sexual assault with a minor under 14 and attempted lewdness with a minor under 14. He was sentenced to four to fifteen years.

Career statistics

Regular season and playoffs

International

References

External links

1977 births
Living people
Adirondack Red Wings players
Bracknell Bees players
Canadian expatriate ice hockey players in England
Canadian ice hockey defencemen
Canadian people convicted of child sexual abuse
Chicago Wolves players
Cleveland Lumberjacks players
Detroit Vipers players
Ice hockey people from British Columbia
Las Vegas Wranglers players
Quebec Citadelles players
Red Deer Rebels players
Tampa Bay Lightning draft picks
Tampa Bay Lightning players